"Pride" is a Japanese-language song by Scandal. The song begins; "Kokoro made wa ubaenai Nandodemo nandodemo kakedaseru."

It was the ninth major-label single (12th overall) released by the band. The title track was used as the second ending theme for the anime Star Driver: Kagayaki no Takuto. The first press edition came with a Star Driver: Kagayaki no Takuto wide-cap sticker and a special booklet. The single reached #7 on the Oricon weekly chart and charted for ten weeks, selling 25,531 copies.

Track listing

References 

2011 singles
Scandal (Japanese band) songs
Anime songs
2011 songs
Epic Records singles